St. Joseph Township may refer to:

In Canada:
 St. Joseph Township, Ontario

In the United States:
 St. Joseph Township, Champaign County, Illinois
 St. Joseph Township, Allen County, Indiana
 St. Joseph Township, Berrien County, Michigan (Saint Joseph Charter Township)
 St. Joseph Township, Stearns County, Minnesota
 St. Joseph Township, Kittson County, Minnesota
 St. Joseph Township, Pembina County, North Dakota
 St. Joseph Township, Williams County, Ohio

Township name disambiguation pages